Don Ameche (born Dominic Felix Amici; May 31, 1908 – December 6, 1993) was an American actor, comedian and vaudevillian. After playing in college shows, stocks, and vaudevilles, he became a major radio star in the early 1930s, which led to the offer of a movie contract from 20th Century Fox in 1935.

As a handsome, debonair leading man in 40 films over the next 14 years, he starred in comedies, dramas, and musicals. In the 1950s he worked on Broadway and in television, and was the host of NBC's International Showtime from 1961 to 1965. Returning to film work in his later years, Ameche enjoyed a fruitful revival of his career beginning with his role as a villain in Trading Places (1983) and won the Academy Award for Best Supporting Actor for his performance in Cocoon (1985).

Early life
Don Ameche was born as Dominic Felix Amici on May 31, 1908, in Kenosha, Wisconsin. His father, Felice Amici, was a bartender from Montemonaco, Ascoli Piceno, Marche, Italy. His mother, Barbara Etta Hertel, was of Scottish, Irish, and German ancestry. Ameche was the second-oldest of eight children; he had three brothers, Umberto (Bert), James (Jim Ameche), and Louis, and four sisters, Elizabeth, Catherine, Mary and Anna. Ameche attended Marquette University, Loras College, and the University of Wisconsin–Madison, where his cousin Alan Ameche played football and won the Heisman Trophy in 1954.

Career

Ameche had done well in college dramatics at the University of Wisconsin, and when a lead actor for a stock company production of Excess Baggage did not turn up, a friend persuaded him to stand in for the missing actor. He enjoyed the experience and got a juvenile lead in Jerry For Short in New York, followed by a tour in vaudeville with Texas Guinan until she dropped him from the act, dismissing him as "too stiff".

According to one biography, Ameche then moved to Chicago, where "he began a radio career in 1930 on Empire Builders, a program broadcast from the Merchandise Mart. By 1932, Ameche had become the leading man on two other Chicago-based programs: the dramatic anthology First Nighter and Betty and Bob, considered by many to be the forerunner of the soap-opera genre."

Brought to Hollywood by 20th-Century Fox producer Darryl Zanuck, Ameche played mostly romantic leads paired with many of the top female stars of the era. In 1939, Ameche played the title character in The Story of Alexander Graham Bell (1939). It led to the use of the word "ameche" as juvenile slang for a telephone, as noted by Mike Kilen in the Iowa City Gazette (December 8, 1993): "The film prompted a generation to call people to the telephone with the phrase: 'You're wanted on the Ameche.'" Such an identity between Ameche and the telephone was forged, that in the 1940 film Go West, Groucho Marx proclaims, "Telephone? This is 1870, Don Ameche hasn't invented the telephone yet."

Ameche was Alice Faye's leading man in Hollywood Cavalcade (1939), then played another real-life figure, Stephen Foster, in Swanee River (1939). He did a third biopic, Lillian Russell (1940) with Faye, and was top billed in a war film, Four Sons (1940), and a musical, Down Argentine Way (1940), which helped make stars of Betty Grable and Carmen Miranda. In 1940, he was voted the 21st-most-popular star in Hollywood.

Ameche did Happy Land (1943), Wing and a Prayer (1944), and Greenwich Village (1944). In 1944, he reportedly earned $247,677 for 1943, making him the second highest earner at 20th Century Fox after Spyros Skouras.

Following his appearances as announcer and sketch participant on The Chase and Sanborn Hour, Ameche achieved memorable success during the late 1940s playing opposite Frances Langford in The Bickersons, the Philip Rapp radio comedy series about a combative married couple. It began on NBC in 1946, moving to CBS the following year. He also had his own program, The Old Gold Don Ameche Show, on NBC Red in the early 1940s.

In 1950 Ameche became the star of Holiday Hotel, on ABC-TV.

He earned good reviews for the David Mamet and Shel Silverstein-penned Things Change (1988); The New York Times said that he showed "the kind of great comic aplomb that wins actors awards for other than sentimental reasons."<ref>Canby, Vincent. Things Change (1988) October 21, 1988 Review/Film; Mamet's Unwiseguys", New York Times movie review.</ref>

Personal life
From 1946 to 1949, Ameche, with other Los Angeles entertainment figures including Bing Crosby and Bob Hope, was a co-owner of the Los Angeles Dons of the All-America Football Conference, a rival to the National Football League. He was instrumental in forming and leading the ownership group the year before play began and initially served as team president.

Ameche was married to Honore Prendergast from 1932 until her death in 1986. They had six children. One, Ron Ameche, owned a restaurant, "Ameche's Pumpernickel" in Coralville, Iowa. He had two daughters, Connie and Bonnie. Ameche's younger brother, Jim Ameche, also a well-known actor, died in 1983 at the age of 67.

Ameche was Roman Catholic. A Republican, he supported the campaign of Thomas Dewey in the 1944 United States presidential election and 
Dwight Eisenhower during the 1952 presidential election.

Death
On December 6, 1993, Ameche died at his son Don, Jr.'s house in Scottsdale, Arizona, of prostate cancer
at age 85. He was cremated and his ashes are buried at Resurrection Catholic Cemetery in Asbury, Iowa.

Filmography

Film / TV

Short subjects

 Screen Snapshots: Stars at the Tropical Ice Gardens (1939)
 Weekend in Hollywood (1947)
 Screen Snapshots: Hollywood Night at 21 Club (1952)

Stage work
 Hazel Flagg (1954)
 Silk Stockings (1955)
 Holiday for Lovers (1957)
 Goldilocks (1958)
 13 Daughters (1961)
 How to Succeed in Business Without Really Trying (1966)
 Henry, Sweet Henry (1967)
 The Moon Is Blue (1972)
 No, No, Nanette (1972)
 Never Get Smart with an Angel (1977)
 Mame (1978)
 Life with Father (1979)
 How to Succeed in Business Without Really Trying (1981)
 Our Town'' (1989) (replacement for Spalding Gray)

Radio appearances

See also

References

Bibliography

External links

 
 
 
 

1908 births
1993 deaths
20th Century Studios contract players
20th-century American male actors
20th-century American singers
Actors from Kenosha, Wisconsin
American horse racing announcers
American male film actors
American male television actors
American male voice actors
American male musical theatre actors
American male radio actors
American male stage actors
American people of German descent
American people of Irish descent
American people of Italian descent
American people of Scottish descent
American sports announcers
Best Supporting Actor Academy Award winners
Deaths from cancer in Arizona
Deaths from prostate cancer
Male actors from Wisconsin
University of Wisconsin–Madison alumni
Vaudeville performers
Volpi Cup for Best Actor winners
California Republicans
Arizona Republicans
Wisconsin Republicans
Catholics from Wisconsin
20th-century American male singers